The Finnish Forest Research Institute, known as Metla, is a subordinate agency to the Ministry of Agriculture and Forestry of the Government of Finland. It has statutory duties to promote, through research, the economical, ecological, and socially sustainable management and use of forests. Metla is one of Europe's largest forestry research institutes, with an annual budget of around €40 million and 9 main research units (in Joensuu, Kannus, Kolari, Loppi's Läyliäinen, Parkano, Savonlinna's Punkaharju, Rovaniemi, Suonenjoki and Vantaa).

External links
 

Forest research institutes
Government of Finland
Research institutes in Finland
Forestry in Finland